Jeremy Tolleson is an American retired defender who played professionally in the United Soccer Leagues.

Player
Tolleson attended Wheaton College, where he played on the men’s NCAA Division III college soccer team from 2001 to 2004, and was the 2004 College Conference of Illinois and Wisconsin Player of the Year.

During his college years Tolleson also played two seasons for the Cascade Surge in the USL Premier Development League, where he was named to the 2004 All Western Conference team.

Tolleson signed with the Cleveland City Stars in the USL Second Division on January 7, 2007. He led the team in minutes played in 2008, helping the Stars win the USL-2 championship.  On February 13, 2009, he signed with the Carolina RailHawks of the USL First Division.  He was the team defender of the year and also went on loan to the Richmond Kickers for one game.  In February 2010, Tolleson retired to become a missionary in Honduras.

Coach
From 2007 to 2009, Tolleson served as an assistant coach with the Gordon College men’s soccer team.

References

External links
 Carolina RailHawks bio

Living people
American soccer players
North Carolina FC players
Cascade Surge players
Cleveland City Stars players
Richmond Kickers players
USL First Division players
USL Second Division players
USL League Two players
Wheaton College (Illinois) alumni
American expatriate sportspeople in Honduras
Association football defenders
1982 births